MEL Equipment was a British manufacturer of radar, avionics and military radio equipment based in West Sussex.

History

The company was formed as Radio Transmission Equipment in March 1935 in south London. Later it was fully acquired by Philips and renamed Mullard Equipment Ltd. It moved to Crawley in 1961.

In the 1970s, the company was employing around 2,250.

Products
 Larkspur radio equipment
 Clansman radio equipment
 EKCO E390/564 airborne weather radar (for Concorde)
 Microwave Airborne Digital Guidance Equipment
 Precision approach radar
 Radar transponders

Products currently made by the Thales site
 Cerberus Mission System for Royal Navy helicopters
 Searchwater radar

See also
 Hensoldt
 Thales Training & Simulation
 Mullard

References

External links
 Grace's Guide
 Radio Transmission Equipment

Aircraft component manufacturers of the United Kingdom
Electronics companies of the United Kingdom
Companies based in Crawley
Defunct manufacturing companies of the United Kingdom
Electronics companies established in 1935
Radar manufacturers
Science and technology in West Sussex
Thales Group divisions and subsidiaries